Bartholomeus Corneliszoon van Bassen (1590–1652) was a Dutch Golden Age painter and architect.

Biography

Van Bassen was the illegitimate son of Cornelis van Bassen and the grandson of Bartholt Ernst van Bassen, who both lived and died in The Hague.  Little is known of his early life, but according to the Netherlands Institute for Art History he became a member of the Delft Guild of St. Luke in 1613. In 1622 he moved to The Hague, where he became a member of The Hague Guild of St. Luke two years later and where he became dean in 1627 and headman in 1636 and 1640. He is known for his architectural works, sometimes with staffage by the painters Anthonie Palamedesz., Esaias van de Velde, and Jan Martszen de Jonge.

In 1638 he became city architect of the Hague. He worked on the summer palace Huis Honselaarsdijk for Frederick Henry, Prince of Orange (torn down after being used as a military hospital during the War of 1812), the restoration of the City Hall, and from 1649 onwards he was involved with building the Nieuwe Kerk.

Van Bassen was also involved in a number of nationwide architectural projects. His most important building was "Het Koningshuis", the summer palace of Frederick V, Elector Palatine. Called "King of Bohemia"  for one winter, he is remembered in the Netherlands as the "Winterkoning" for this reason. His summer palace was in the town of Rhenen, near Utrecht, and it was built to Bassen's design in 1629-1631. This palace, like Honselaarsdijk, was also used as a military hospital during the War of 1812 and was torn down soon after.

He kept a workshop and took on pupils, most notably Gerard Houckgeest and Jan van der Vucht.  He died in The Hague.

See also
List of Dutch architects

References

Biography at Web Gallery of Art

Bibliography
 Hans Jantzen, Das Niederländische Architekturbild, Braunschweig, Klinkhardt & Biermann, 1910
 Bernard G. Maillet, La Peinture Architecturale des Ecoles du Nord : les Intérieurs d'Eglises 1580-1720, Pandora Publishers Wijnegem, 2012,

External links
Bartholomeus van Bassen on Artnet
www.artcyclopedia.com — overview
Works and overview of Literature
Vermeer and The Delft School, a full text exhibition catalog from The Metropolitan Museum of Art, which contains material on Bartholomeus van Bassen
Artwork of van Bassen at the Staten Museum for Kunst

Dutch Golden Age architects
Dutch Golden Age painters
1590 births
1652 deaths
Dutch Baroque architects
Court architects
Dutch male painters
Architects from The Hague
Painters from Delft
Painters from The Hague
17th-century Dutch architects